is a manga by Osamu Tezuka, and also the name of one of his books in Kodansha's line of "Osamu Tezuka Manga Complete Works" books, contains a collection of Tezuka's short stories.  The stories included in the book are "Rainbow Prelude", "The Curtain is Still Blue Tonight", a manga version of Shakespeare's "The Merchant of Venice", "Peacock Shell", and "Song of the White Peacock".

Plot

Rainbow Prelude
A young French girl meets and falls in love with Frédéric Chopin, at the time when Poland was occupied by Russian troops.

See also
List of Osamu Tezuka manga
The Merchant of Venice, the original play by Shakespeare.

External links
Rainbow Prelude  manga publications page at TezukaOsamu@World

1975 manga
Kodansha manga
Osamu Tezuka manga
Shogakukan manga
Shōjo manga
Works about pianos and pianists